Air-Transport Europe spol. s r.o.  is a specialist Slovak airline based in Poprad. Using a business jet and a helicopter fleet, it undertakes personal transport, helicopter emergency medical services (HEMS), aerial works and contract helicopter services. It is also an authorised service centre for AgustaWestland and MIL helicopters. Its main base is Poprad-Tatry International Airport (TAT), with other bases at Košice International Airport (KSC), M. R. Štefánik Airport (BTS) Bratislava, Banská Bystrica, Nitra, Trenčín and Žilina. ATE is provider of 7 HEMS bases in Slovakia and 2 HEMS bases in the Czech Republic.

History 
The airline was established in 1990 and started operations in 1991.

In 2011, Air-Transport Europe became a member of ICAR-CISA, the International Commission for Air Rescue.

Fleet 
The Air Transport Europe fleet consists of (as of January 2022):
 8 Agusta A109K2 helicopters
 4 Eurocopter EC135 helicopters
 3 Bell 429 helicopters
 1 Cessna 550 Encore business jet

Notes and references

External links 

Official website
Helicopter Emergency Medical Service
"Army Gave No Bid Copter Contract to Slovak Ambulance Firm"

Airlines of Slovakia
Airlines established in 1990
Helicopter airlines
Slovakian companies established in 1990